"Everything But You" is a song by English group Clean Bandit featuring Swedish producer A7S. The song was released on 18 February 2022 by label Atlantic Records UK. The song was written by Clean Bandit members Grace Chatto and Jack Patterson, alongside A7S, Digital Farm Animals, Tom Grennan and Phil Plested.

Charts

Weekly  charts

Year-end charts

References

2022 singles
2022 songs
Clean Bandit songs
Atlantic Records singles
Songs written by Grace Chatto
Songs written by Jack Patterson (Clean Bandit)
Songs written by Digital Farm Animals
Songs written by A7S
Songs written by Tom Grennan
Song recordings produced by Digital Farm Animals
Song recordings produced by Mark Ralph (record producer)